Anita Raja (born 1953) is an Italian translator and writer.

Early life, family and education 
Anita Raja was born in Naples, Italy, the daughter of Golda Frieda Petzenbaum and Renato Raja. Anita's German-born Polish-Jewish mother Petzenbaum was born in Worms, her family leaving Nazi Germany in 1937 for Italy. She was raised in Rome.

Career
Raja has translated many literary works from German to Italian. Authors of these works include Christa Wolf, Franz Kafka, The Brothers Grimm, Hermann Hesse, and Bertolt Brecht. Other authors include: Ilse Aichinger, Irmtraud Morgner, Sarah Kirsch, Christoph Hein, Hans Magnus Enzensberger and Veit Heinichen.

She has written articles on Italian and German literature and the problems of translation. In 2008, she received a German–Italian translator award.

In 2016, an Italian journalist claimed, through investigations on the payments to Raja from a publisher commensurate with certain sales of books, that Raja was the author behind the pen name Elena Ferrante.

Personal life
Raja is married. Her husband Domenico Starnone is a writer and journalist.

References

External links 
 Anita Raja at Archivio di Festivaletteratura
  
 

1953 births
Living people
Italian Jews
Italian people of German descent
Italian people of Polish-Jewish descent
Italian translators
Italian writers
Jewish Italian writers
People from Naples